Van der Zyl is a surname. Notable people with the surname include:

Marie van der Zyl (born 1965), President of the Board of Deputies of British Jews from June 2018
Nikki van der Zyl (born 1935), German voice actress
Werner van der Zyl (1902–1984), British Reform rabbi

See also
Van Zyl